The Beaury Creek, a perennial stream of the Clarence River catchment, is located in the Northern Rivers region of New South Wales, Australia.

Course and features
The river flows generally south southwest, joined by one minor tributary before reaching its confluence with the Tooloom Creek near Tooloom. The river descends  over its  course.

See also

 Rivers of New South Wales
 List of rivers of New South Wales (A-K)
 List of rivers of Australia
 Tooloom National Park

References

 

Rivers of New South Wales
Northern Rivers